Haig Manoogian (May 23, 1916 – May 26, 1980) was an Armenian-American professor of film at New York University who served as the main influence for many filmmakers such as Martin Scorsese, who was a student of his at New York University. Martin Scorsese called Manoogian teachings “The most precious gift I have ever received.”

Martin Scorsese 
Manoogian co-produced Scorsese's first feature film Who's That Knocking at My Door. Martin Scorsese’s classic film Raging Bull is dedicated to him. Scorsese has named Manoogian as one of his largest inspirations.

Ares Demertzis 
Director and cameraman Ares Demertzis was an undergraduate and later graduate student of Manoogian.  He documented some of his experiences in a short story published on the monthly web magazine New English Review, titled “TMR 101, The Making of a Film Director.”

References 
 
 The Religious Affiliation of Director Martin Scorsese

External links 
 

1916 births
1980 deaths
American people of Armenian descent
New York University faculty